Angie Nelp (born February 23, 1980) is an American basketball coach and former player who is currently the head women's basketball coach at the University of Tulsa.

Coaching career 
Nelp began her coaching career as a head coach at Yorktown High School in Indiana for two seasons before moving on to Arkansas as a graduate assistant. She went on to Marquette to be their assistant director of basketball operations before joining Mercer as an assistant coach. She also had stints as an assistant at Rice and Arizona State.

Tulsa 
Nelp was named the head coach at Tulsa on April 12, 2021.

Colorado State statistics

Source

Head coaching record

References

External links 
 
 Tulsa profile

1980 births
Living people
People from Eufaula, Oklahoma
Basketball players from Oklahoma
Basketball coaches from Oklahoma
Forwards (basketball)
Colorado State Rams women's basketball players
High school basketball coaches in Indiana
Arkansas Razorbacks women's basketball coaches
Marquette Golden Eagles women's basketball coaches
Mercer Bears women's basketball coaches
Rice Owls women's basketball coaches
Arizona State Sun Devils women's basketball coaches
Tulsa Golden Hurricane women's basketball coaches
American expatriate basketball people in Sweden